= Tandarica =

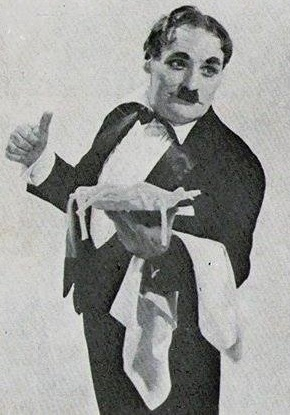

Alexandru Veterany, better known by his stage name Tandarica (16 January 1926, Bucharest – 1 May 1995, Buenos Aires), was an actor of comedy, popular in cinema, theater and television in Argentina during the 1980s.
